Anthony Konyegwachie (born 10 May 1970) is a Nigerian boxer. He competed in the men's featherweight event at the 1988 Summer Olympics. At the 1988 Summer Olympics, he lost to Daniel Dumitrescu of Romania.

References

External links
 

1970 births
Living people
Nigerian male boxers
Olympic boxers of Nigeria
Boxers at the 1988 Summer Olympics
Place of birth missing (living people)
Featherweight boxers